Lalganj Lok Sabha constituency  is one of the 80 Lok Sabha (parliamentary) constituencies in Uttar Pradesh state in northern India.

Assembly segments
Presently, Lalganj Lok Sabha constituency comprises five Vidhan Sabha (legislative assembly) segments. These are:

Members of Parliament

Election results

See also
 Azamgarh district
 List of Constituencies of the Lok Sabha

Notes

External links
Lalganj lok sabha  constituency election 2019 result details

Lok Sabha constituencies in Uttar Pradesh
Politics of Azamgarh district